Paul Kevin Allen (born 28 August 1962) is an English former professional footballer and delegate liaison officer for the Professional Footballers' Association.

As a player, he was a midfielder who notably played top flight football for West Ham United, Tottenham Hotspur and Southampton, with appearance for Spurs and the Saints in the Premier League. He also played in the Football League for Luton Town, Stoke City, Swindon Town, Bristol City and Millwall. He won three caps for England at under-21 level.

Career
At 17 years and 256 days old, Allen's appearance for West Ham United against Arsenal in the 1980 FA Cup Final made him the youngest player to appear in an FA Cup final at Wembley Stadium, though James Prinsep played at a younger age at Kennington Oval in 1879. Both records have since been broken. His debut for West Ham had come on 29 September 1979 when 32 days after his 17th birthday he had appeared for the club in their 2–1 home win over Burnley in the Second Division. He collected a Second Division title medal for the Hammers in 1980–81 and helped re-establish them as a First Division side. He made 152 league appearances for the Hammers, scoring six goals, before a £400,000 fee took him to their London rivals Tottenham Hotspur on 19 June 1985.

He scored on his debut in an emphatic 4–0 win at White Hart Lane versus Watford. Allen went on to play in two FA Cup finals for Tottenham Hotspur, on the losing side in 1987 alongside his cousin Clive Allen. However, Allen was victorious in the 1991 FA Cup defeating Nottingham Forest 2–1. In eight years with Tottenham, he played 292 league games and scored 23 goals. He was voted player of the year for the 1992–93 season, his final full season at White Hart Lane.

He remained at White Hart Lane until 16 September 1993, when a £550,000 deal took him to Southampton. He played 33 FA Premier League games in 1993–94, scoring once, but played just ten league games without scoring in 1994–95 and was loaned out for 17 games to Stoke City, scoring once in a 4–2 defeat away at Southend United in March 1995. He then signed for Swindon Town on a free transfer and helped them win the Division Two title (and promotion to Division One) in 1995–96.

Personal life
Allen comes from a family of footballers, his uncles are former Reading striker Dennis Allen and fellow Tottenham player Les Allen. His cousins are Martin Allen, Clive Allen and Bradley Allen.

After retiring from playing football at the end of the 1997–98, which he spent in Division One with Millwall, he now works for the Professional Footballers' Association (PFA) in their Player Services Department Professional Footballers' Association.

Career statistics

Honours

West Ham United
 FA Cup: 1979–80

Tottenham Hotspur
 FA Cup: 1990–91; runners-up: 1986–87
 FA Charity Shield: 1991

Swindon Town
 Football League Division Two: 1995–96

Individual
 West Ham United Hammer of the Year: 1985
 Tottenham Hotspur Player of the Year: 1991

References

External links
 
 

1962 births
Living people
People from Aveley
English footballers
England under-21 international footballers
Association football midfielders
West Ham United F.C. players
Tottenham Hotspur F.C. players
Southampton F.C. players
Luton Town F.C. players
Stoke City F.C. players
Swindon Town F.C. players
Bristol City F.C. players
Millwall F.C. players
English Football League players
Premier League players
Thurrock F.C. players
Paul
FA Cup Final players